Nijssen is a Dutch patronymic surname originating from the given name "Denijs" (Denis). People with this surname include:

Nijssen
 Han Nijssen (1935–2013), Dutch ichthyologist
 Sjir Nijssen (born 1938), Dutch computer scientist known for Nijssen's Information Analysis Method
 Tom Nijssen (born 1964), Dutch tennis player

Nyssen
Hubert Nyssen (1925–2011), Belgian writer and publisher

See also
De Nijs
Nijs
Nissen (surname)

Dutch-language surnames
Patronymic surnames
Surnames from given names